Zdeněk Kettner (born 1974) is a Czech teacher and politician who is an MP in the Chamber of Deputies for the Freedom and Direct Democracy party.

Biography 
Kettner is a native of Teplice. He worked as a high school physics and computer science teacher for over twenty years. In 2021, he became chairman of the SPD in the Ústí Region, replacing former SPD MP Tereza Hyťhová who left the party. He also serves as a member of the city council for Teplice. In this role, he has opposed spending money on expanding a migrant centre in Teplice. Kettner has also served as an MP in the Chamber of Representatives since 2021.

References 

1974 births
Living people
21st-century Czech politicians
Freedom and Direct Democracy MPs
Members of the Chamber of Deputies of the Czech Republic (2021–2025)
People from Teplice
Jan Evangelista Purkyně University in Ústí nad Labem alumni